The Mobile campaign was a military campaign of the American Civil War in the western theatre in the Spring of 1865 to take the city of Mobile, Alabama.  Opposing forces included the Union Army, and the Confederate Army.  Important battles were fought at Spanish Fort and Fort Blakeley.

Background 

In 1860, Mobile was the South's fourth-largest city, and home to several shipbuilding companies.
Until 1862 when the Union Army captured New Orleans, Mobile was the second-largest port city of the South. Mobile was a key hub for the cotton trade upon which the South's economy depended, and the gateway to the interior of Alabama. Its position at the northern point of Mobile Bay made it a strategic location; if it fell, the Union Army's advance would be unimpeded.

Before the Siege 
The Mobile Campaign was a series of battles fought during the civil war in the Federal’s efforts to capture the city of Mobile, Alabama. From March 26th to April 9th, 1865, 6,000 outnumbered Confederate soldiers held off 45,000 Union soldiers that were attacking from Fort Blakeley and Spanish fort. The Union troops knew that the capture of Mobile would be one of the key points of ending the Civil War. 

Union Major General Gordon Granger's original plan was to attempt to capture Mobile right after the fall of Fort Morgan. To capture the city, Granger wanted to bring his troops up the bay, disembark on Dog River, and march into Mobile. Even though Mobile did have a lot of earthen protection, its number of men that were defending it was very scarce. According to Paul Brueske, author of The Last Siege, “Had the Federals known how few men defended Mobile, they could have then captured the city with minimal losses.”  However, after the battle of Mobile Bay, Confederate General Maury, fearing an attack from the Federals, asked his superiors for reinforcements. Confederate General Lidell was sent to aid Maury. In late 1864, Union Major General Henry W. Halleck sent a letter to General Grant asking for the Armies of the Cumberland to be sent to General Canby to aid him in capturing Mobile.  General Halleck planned to use Mobile as a base to attack Selma and Montgomery in later battles because Mobile was one of Alabama’s key sources for supplies such as ammunition and food. Canby was apprehensive in attacking Mobile due to the strong defenses the Confederates had established. The Federals could not attack from the north due to a marsh in that direction. Many large vessels could not get within 12-miles of Mobile because of these geographical features. General Pierre Gustave Toutant Beauregard boasted that Mobile would hold a siege for at least two months. 

General Richard S. Taylor, son of Zachary Taylor, directed the small garrison that defended Mobile. In December of 1864, Granger initiated a raid on Mobile’s western defenses. However, on December 26, Granger and his men had to turn back due to a shortage of supplies and they could not break through the strong defense that the Confederates had put up. This raid encouraged Alabama Governor Thomas H. Watt to issue a draft for more men to fight and to defend Mobile from Federal attacks. General Taylor directed General Gibson’s and Holtzclaw’s brigades along with General French’s Division to defend Mobile. Despite that, these brigades suffered many losses at the Battles of Franklin and Nashville. 

On January 28, Lieutenant John T. Walker prepared to attack the Federal flagship Octorara docked in Mobile Bay with his vessel, the Saint Patrick. The torpedo that he was using to attack the ship malfunctioned and failed to explode, which caused the Federals to attack the Confederate vessel. After the attack, Federals stopped blockade running from Mobile Bay, but Confederates were still apprehensive that the Federals would attack the city of Mobile.

Campaign 

Mobile was besieged by the Union Army from March 25 to April 12, 1865. The city capitulated on April 12.

See also 

 Battle of Nashville
 Mobile campaign Union order of battle
 Mobile campaign Confederate order of battle
 Sherman's March to the Sea
 Wilson's Raid

References

Further reading 

 
 
 
 Silkenat, David. Raising the White Flag: How Surrender Defined the American Civil War. Chapel Hill: University of North Carolina Press, 2019. .

1865 in Alabama
1865 in the American Civil War
April 1865 events
Battles of the American Civil War in Alabama
Battles of the Lower Seaboard Theater and Gulf Approach of the American Civil War
Events in Mobile, Alabama
March 1865 events
 
Sieges of the American Civil War
Union victories of the American Civil War